Ross Porter C.M. is a Canadian former broadcast executive and music writer.

Career
Porter was a producer and host for CBC Radio 2, where he was associated with programs including Night Lines, Latenight and After Hours, from 2004 to 2018 he was president and CEO of the Toronto non-profit jazz radio station CJRT-FM (JAZZ.FM91). Porter was a pop culture reporter for CBC Television's The National and CBC Newsworld's On the Arts. He was named vice-president of the jazz television channel CoolTV in 2003.

Porter published a consumer guide to jazz recordings, The Essential Jazz Recordings: 101 CDs, in 2006. He is a two-time winner for Broadcaster of the Year at Canada's National Jazz Awards, in 2002 and 2004. In 2009, the Jazz Journalists Association nominated Porter for the Willis Conover-Marian McPartland Award for Broadcasting.

In June 2014, Porter was made a member of the Order of Canada for his contributions to broadcasting and developing Canadian talent over a forty-year career.

Allegations
In 2018, after a group of employees, past employees, and contractors made allegations of sexual misconduct and workplace harassment against Porter, who denied these allegations but stepped down as President and CEO of JAZZ.FM. The board of directors was overthrown the following year. While donors expressed strong support of the station, some were reportedly "angry" Porter was still employed at JAZZ.FM.; Porter made his final broadcast on April 27, 2019.

References

External links
JAZZ.FM91 Website

Canadian radio executives
Canadian writers about music
University of Ottawa alumni
Writers from Ottawa
Living people
CBC Radio hosts
Year of birth missing (living people)